The 2003 Georgetown Hoyas football team was an American football team that represented Georgetown University during the 2003 NCAA Division I-AA football season. The Hoyas tied for last in the Patriot League.

In their 11th year under head coach Bob Benson, the Hoyas compiled a 4–8 record. Andrew Clarke, Matt Fronczke, William Huisking and Luke McArdle were the team captains.

The Hoyas were outscored 334 to 272. Georgetown's 1–6 conference record tied for last place in the Patriot League standings.

Georgetown played its home games at Harbin Field on the university campus in Washington, D.C.

Schedule

References

Georgetown
Georgetown Hoyas football seasons
Georgetown Hoyas football